Archdale is a city in Guilford and Randolph counties in the U.S. state of North Carolina. Located  15 miles southwest of Greensboro, it is part of the Greensboro-High Point Metropolitan Statistical Area of the Piedmont Triad metro region. The population was 11,415 at the 2010 census, up from 9,014 in 2000.

Geography
Archdale is located primarily in Randolph County and extends north into Guilford County; the geographic center of the city is at  (35.903996, -79.966080). It is bordered to the southwest by the city of Trinity and to the north by the city of High Point.

Interstate 85 passes through Archdale, with access from Exits 111 and 113. I-85 leads northeast  to Greensboro and southwest  to Charlotte. Interstate 74 passes just east of Archdale, leading northwest  to Winston-Salem and southeast  to Asheboro.

The city is within the watershed of the Deep River, a tributary of the Cape Fear River. Muddy Creek, a tributary of the Deep River rises within the city limits of Archdale.

Demographics

2020 census

As of the 2020 United States census, there were 11,907 people, 4,596 households, and 2,977 families residing in the city.

2010 census
As of the census of 2010, there were 11,415 people, 4,556 households, and 3,137 families residing in the city. The population density was 1,151.8 people per square mile (444.5/km2). There were 4,916 housing units at an average density of 509.3 per square mile (196.6/km2). The racial makeup of the city was 87.8% White, 4% African American, 0.6% Native American, 4% Asian, 1.4% from other races, and 1.4% from two or more races. Hispanic or Latino of any race were 4% of the population.

There were 4,556 households, out of which 30.7% had children under the age of 18 living with them, 52.3% were married couples living together, 12.3% had a female householder with no husband present, and 31.1% were non-families. 26.6% of all households were made up of individuals, and 9.8% had someone living alone who was 65 years of age or older. The average household size was 2.46 and the average family size was 2.97.

In the city, the population was spread out, with 23.8% under the age of 18, 7.2% from 18 to 24, 26.6% from 25 to 44, 26.8% from 45 to 64, and 15.6% who were 65 years of age or older. The median age was 40 years. For every 100 females, there were 90.7 males. For every 100 females age 18 and over, there were 86 males.

The median income for a household in the city was $48,291, and the median income for a family was $55,872. Males had a median income of $34,449 versus $24,456 for females. The per capita income for the city was $22,830. About 6.7% of families and 9.7% of the population were below the poverty line, including 13.9% of those under age 18 and 7.8% of those age 65 or over.

History
Archdale, previously known as "Bush Hill", began as a predominantly Quaker settlement and received the name "Archdale" as a tribute to John Archdale, a lord proprietor and an early Quaker governor. It was incorporated in July 1969. Water and sewer service were needed because the area was "heavy clay". Voters in the area held a referendum, though residents of Trinity decided not to join Archdale.

The Moses Hammond House and Harper House are listed on the National Register of Historic Places.

Jerry W. Tillman (1940-2023), North Carolina legislator, was born in Archdale.

Attractions
Creekside Park, Archdale Parks and Recreation
Kersey Valley 
The Bush Hill Festival

References

External links
 City of Archdale official website
 Archdale–Trinity Chamber of Commerce

Cities in North Carolina
Cities in Guilford County, North Carolina
Cities in Randolph County, North Carolina